Ezio Riboldi (28 August 1878 – 27 January 1965) is an Italian politician who has served as a Deputy of the Kingdom of Italy for three legislatures and Mayor of Monza from 1914 to 1917.

References

Bibliography 
 

1878 births
1965 deaths
Italian Socialist Party politicians
Italian Communist Party politicians
Deputies of Legislature XXV of the Kingdom of Italy
Deputies of Legislature XXVI of the Kingdom of Italy
Deputies of Legislature XXVII of the Kingdom of Italy
Mayors of Monza